Gansu is a region in northwest China. The capital is Lanzhou, a city with a vibrant musical life, including many nightclubs. The daoqing folk tradition is an important part of the music of Gansu, especially in Huanxian; daoqing is also found in Yichi in Ningxia and Dingbian in Shaanxi. Daoqing is used to accompany shadow play theater.

Daoqing comes from the Tang Dynasty and was originally a cappella Taoist music. Beginning with the Southern Song Dynasty, however, percussion instruments like the jianban and yugu have been used, and the lyrical themes have moved from Taoist parables to folktales. Other instruments used include gongs, cymbals, suona, dina (small suona), shuibangzi, flute, sixian, bangu and erhu.  One of Gansu's most notable musicians in the West is Jie Ma, who blends her family's traditional pipa and ruan technique with more contemporary forms such as jazz, improvisation, fusion, and world music and lives in the United States.

Wild Children, a folk-rock band from Lanzhou but based in Beijing, blended Gansu folk songs with more contemporary sounds until the death in 2004 of its co-founder, Xiao Suo.

References

Notes
  China Daily
  China Daily

Gansu
Culture in Gansu